Soy el mismo (I am the Same) is the sixth studio album recorded by Puerto Rican singer Eddie Santiago released in 1991. The album became his sixth  number-one album on the Billboard Tropical Albums chart.

Track listing
This information adapted from Allmusic.

Chart performance

See also
List of number-one Billboard Tropical Albums from the 1990s

References

1991 albums
Eddie Santiago albums